Abacetus perrieri is a species of ground beetle in the subfamily Pterostichinae. It was described by Tschitscherine in 1903.

References

perrieri
Beetles described in 1903